Byåsen Upper Secondary School is a public upper secondary school located in the Byåsen area of Trondheim, Norway.

The school was founded in 2004, and is built on a site that was previously home to military barracks and storage buildings.
In addition to the school, the building also contains a public library and a gym.

External links
Byåsen videregående skole
3T Treningssenter
Trondheim Public Library

Secondary schools in Norway
Education in Trondheim
Trøndelag County Municipality
Educational institutions established in 2004
2004 establishments in Norway